Upper Franconia is a Regierungsbezirk (administrative [Regierungs] region [bezirk]) of the state of Bavaria, southern Germany. It forms part of the historically significant region of Franconia, the others being Middle Franconia and Lower Franconia, which are all now part of the German Federal State of Bayern (Bavaria).

With more than 200 independent breweries which brew approximately 1000 different types of beer, Upper Franconia has the world's highest brewery-density per capita. A special Franconian beer route (Fränkische Brauereistraße) runs through many popular breweries.

Geography
The administrative region borders on Thuringia (Thüringen) to the north, Lower Franconia (Unterfranken) to the west, Middle Franconia (Mittelfranken) to the south-west, and Upper Palatinate (Oberpfalz) to the south-east, Saxony (Sachsen) to the north-east and the Czech Republic to the east.

History

After the founding of the Kingdom of Bavaria the state was totally reorganized and, in 1808, divided into 15 administrative government regions (German: Regierungsbezirke (singular Regierungsbezirk)), in Bavaria called Kreise (singular: Kreis). They were created in the fashion of the French departements, quite even in size and population, and named after their main rivers.

In the following years, due to territorial changes (e. g. loss of Tyrol, addition of the Palatinate), the number of Kreise was reduced to 8. One of these was the Mainkreis (Main District). In 1837 king Ludwig I of Bavaria renamed the Kreise after historical territorial names and tribes of the area. This also involved some border changes or territorial swaps. Thus the name Mainkreis changed to Upper Franconia.

Main sights
Next to the former episcopal residence city of Bamberg, the capital Bayreuth, the former residence city of Coburg and the classicist downtown of Hof, as well as the towns of  Lichtenfels, Kronach, Gößweinstein and Kulmbach, the Weißenstein Palace, Banz Abbey and the Basilica of the Fourteen Holy Helpers, the scenic attractions of the River Main and the low mountain ranges of the Fichtel Mountains with the town of Wunsiedel and the Franconian Forest belong among the region's major tourist attractions. There are also numerous spas like Bad Rodach, Bad Steben, Bad Staffelstein, Bad Berneck and Bad Alexandersbad.

Coat of arms

Administrative subdivisions
Oberfranken is subdivided into nine Landkreise (districts) and four Kreisfreie Städte (district-free or independent cities). The lowest level is divided into 214 municipalities (including four cities).

Landkreise:
 Bamberg
 Bayreuth
 Coburg
 Forchheim
 Hof
 Kronach
 Kulmbach
 Lichtenfels
 Wunsiedel

Kreisfreie Städte:
 Bamberg
 Bayreuth
 Coburg
 Hof

Historical population

Economy 
The gross domestic product (GDP) of the region was 40.6 billion € in 2018, accounting for 1.2% of German economic output. GDP per capita adjusted for purchasing power was €34,900  or 116% of the EU27 average in the same year. The GDP per employee was 96% of the EU average.

See also
 Middle Franconia (Mittelfranken)
 Lower Franconia (Unterfranken)

References

External links
Official website  (in German)
Sights in Frankonia (in German)

 
NUTS 2 statistical regions of the European Union
Wine regions of Germany
Government regions of Germany